Tawab Arash (born 1976) is a singer from Afghanistan. He was born in Herat and is the nephew of the acclaimed composer and singer Amir Jan Sabori. He is the younger brother of the famous Afghan film actor Nemat Arash.

In 1999, after he moved to Russia, he started to sing and learn the keyboard with the encouragement and guidance of his brothers, and in due course with an Indian teacher. Shortly afterward Arash began to perform professionally. In 1996, he moved to Sweden and his first two concerts took place in Stockholm with Mirwais Hamra. He is an ethnic Tajik of Herat.

Discography

Albums
2006: Roshani
2007: Chai Wa Chilam
2010: ''Coming Soon

References

External links
Tawab Arash's official website
Tawab Arash Videos

Living people
21st-century Afghan male singers
Afghan musicians
1976 births
Afghan Tajik people
Pashtun people